The Third Annual Jim Crockett Sr. Memorial Cup Tag Team Tournament, also referred to as the Crocket Cup (1988), was an event held over two nights: April 22 and 23, 1988. Scheduled to feature 24 teams, the tournament included a few changes to the original lineup and ended up with only 22 teams. The team of Sting and Lex Luger was formed specifically for the 1988 Crockett Cup and ended up winning the tournament by defeating Arn Anderson and Tully Blanchard in the finals.

Production

Background
The Jim Crockett Sr. Memorial Cup Tag Team Tournament was created by Jim Crockett Jr. of Jim Crockett Promotions (JCP) in honor of Crockett's father, JCP founder Jim Crockett Sr. The tournament format was single-elimination with a promoted prize of $1 million (U.S.) awarded to the winning team.

Storylines
The 1988 Crockett Cup shows featured a total of 21 professional wrestling matches with different wrestlers involved in pre-existing scripted feuds, plots and storylines. Wrestlers are portrayed as either heels (those that portray the "bad guys"), faces (the "good guy" characters) or tweeners (characters that is neither clearly a heel or a face) as they follow a series of tension-building events, which culminated in a wrestling match or series of matches as determined by the promotion.

Lex Luger, scheduled to partner with Barry Windham in the tournament (as they had been the NWA World Tag Team Champions), lost his teammate. Windham turned on Luger just two days before the tournament. The betrayal caused Luger and Windham to lose the title to Arn Anderson and Tully Blanchard, and Windham became the new fourth member of the Four Horsemen, actually taking a spot Luger had been kicked out of months earlier.

The Super Powers (Nikita Koloff and Dusty Rhodes) were also removed from the tournament. Rhodes received a 120-day suspension on April 15 for hitting Jim Crockett with a baseball bat on the March 26 edition of World Championship Wrestling, and was also stripped of his NWA United States Heavyweight Championship. Koloff was then given a match for Ric Flair's NWA World Heavyweight Championship, to take place on the second night of the tournament.

On the first night of the tournament, between the first and second rounds, Jimmy Garvin defeated Kevin Sullivan in a Blindfold match. Sullivan and Rick Steiner perpetrated a post-match attack on the still blindfolded Garvin. Garvin's brother, Ronnie, attempted to save Jimmy, but during the course of the ensuing brawl, sustained a chest injury due to Sullivan's Golden Spike. This left Sting also without a partner for the tournament, with the announcement later on that Lex Luger and Sting would team up, a partnership that would continue off and on for nearly 15 years.
All of these events left the final tournament field at 22 teams.

Aftermath
The Crockett Cup tournaments ended after 1988 until 2019, the NWA and Ring of Honor teamed up with the Crockett Foundation to resume the tournament (but on a much smaller scale), which is linked to the original tournaments.  The NWA (now owned by Billy Corgan and his production company, Lighting One Inc.) have held the tournament yearly (except in 2020 due to the COVID-19 pandemic).

Lex Luger would feud with Ric Flair over the NWA World Heavyweight Championship, receiving a title shot at the Great American Bash.  The Fantastics' feud with the Midnight Express over the NWA United States Tag Team Championship would reach a climax at the Bash in a match with the two teams with Jim Cornette suspended in a cage wearing a straight jacket.  The Powers of Pain would flee for the WWF before the Bash events began due to their refusal to lose a series of scaffold matches with the Road Warriors.  Dusty Rhodes would return from his suspension after the tournament (kayfabe through the efforts of Houston promoter Paul Boesch) but would not regain his United States title.

Event

Tournament participants

Results

Tournament brackets

The Garvin/Sting and Luger/Windham teams splitting up resulted in the following:
1 The Midnight Express defeated The Sheepherders in the final second-round match. Earlier in that round, The Sheepherders defeated Armstrong and Horner. This filled the empty 23rd spot in the bracket.
2 Anderson and Blanchard received a bye to the semifinal round to make up for the empty 24th spot in the bracket.

References

1988 in North Carolina
1988 in professional wrestling
1988 in South Carolina
Jim Crockett Promotions shows
Professional wrestling in Greensboro, North Carolina
Professional wrestling in South Carolina
National Wrestling Alliance shows
1988